The Tangahoe River is a river of the Taranaki Region of New Zealand's North Island.

Name 
An elder, of Tangahoe and Ngati Hine descent, said the origin of the name, Tangahoe, is that it was given to the river following the loss of a steering oar (hoe) from a fishing waka (boat) at sea, trying to return to its tauranga waka (landing place). It was said that, had it had two steering oars, as on the Aotea waka, then it would have reached its landing.

Pre colonial value 
The Ngati Ruanui Claims Settlement Act 2003 said the river was a major source of resources, providing shellfish and fish, including piharau, kōkopu, tuna and pātiki, birds such as kererū, pūkeko, tiwaiwaka, kāhu, kākāpō, kiwi, korimako, miromiro and pīpīwharauroa and plants, including koromiko, kohia, hinau, piripiri, mamaku, and rewarewa.

Defensive sites 

The steep valley sides of the lower river provided good defensive sites, as marked on the 1:50,000 map.

Otapawa pā was held by Tangahoe, Pakakohi and Ngāti Ruanui when it was attacked on 16 January 1866, during the Second Taranaki War. The account of the attack in 'The adventures of Kimble Bent put Māori losses at 7, but others estimated 30 killed and 30 wounded. The Imperial troops lost 11 dead and 10 wounded. A bulldozer has destroyed most of the site.

Te Ruaki Pa has also been damaged - by cattle.

Tangahoe and Inman's Redoubts date from 17 March 1865. They remain in good condition under pasture.

 Geology 
The river rises on a sandy mid-Pliocene Tangahoe Mudstone, formed in a shallow sea, then its valley is cut down to early-Pliocene Whenuakura Group rocks (bioclastic limestone, pebbly and micaceous sandstones and massive siltstone), whilst the surrounding land is covered by mid-Pleistocene beach deposits of conglomerate, sand, peat and clay. The river carries about 43,900 tonnes of sediment to the sea each year. It enters the sea between 30 and 50 m tall cliffs, eroded over the last 15,000 years, following tectonic uplift. Of the rivers flowing into the S Taranaki Bight, the Tangahoe ranks 13th for flow but 9th for sediment input, with a sediment rate of 1.39 kg/s.

 Water quality 
Water quality in Taranaki has been under pressure. Quality varies over the length of the river, as shown in the table -

In the summer of 2016 the MCI level at the viaduct was the lowest ever, probably due to earthworks by Fonterra, causing the rating to drop to poor. Fonterra's Whareroa dairy has a consent to draw  of water a day from the Tangahoe's tributary, the Tawhiti Stream, where flows, temperature, etc. are recorded at both Tawhiti Rd and Whareroa.  is also consented for irrigation. The dairy removes silt from the water with plastic microbeads.

 Tunnel 

Tangahoe Valley Tunnel runs under the ridge separating Pukekino Rd (leading to Lake Rotorangi) from the Tangahoe Valley. The  tunnel was built in 1928. Digging was from both ends and didn't quite meet in the middle, hence a variation in the roof height in the centre.

In 1954 shotcrete was sprayed to consolidate the walls.

In 1986 part of the roof collapsed in an earthquake and the tunnel was closed. A deep and unstable cutting alongside, which proved to be often unpassable,  served for traffic until, in 1996, South Taranaki District Council decided to reopen the tunnel, which re-opened in 1997, at a cost of $245,000.

In 2003 further restoration work was required, costing $250,000 to remove  in the tunnel approaches, a further  to reach the portal and add  of rock bolts. Further repairs were done in 2009.

The road was surveyed in 1898, money had been spent by 1900 and the road needed repair after floods in 1903, when £500 was voted for a bridge. A bridge was built in 1920 and the road gradually extended up the valley, with money still being voted in 1924.Ohangai Rd crosses the river on a single lane bridge. The road was mentioned in 1877 and the bridge was old enough to need repairs by 1919. A new bridge was built in 1920.

State Highway 3 crosses the river on a  bridge. Until 1871 the route was via Manawapou Rd and the beach at low tide. A bridge was built in 1871 and replaced in 1887. In 1935 it was swept away by a flood on 22 February 1935 and temporarily replaced. Relief work to replace it and its winding route had already started in 1933 and was completed in 1936 at a cost of £6,000. A tender was accepted for a rebuild in 1910.

See also
 List of rivers of New Zealand
 Lake Rotokare on the Te Ararata Stream tributary

References

External links 
 1895 plans of Tangahoe Valley Rd bridge
 2011 plans for bridge strengthening
 photos - 1936 bridge, bridge scaffolding, tunnel eastern portal, river at the rail bridge,

South Taranaki District
Rivers of Taranaki
Rivers of New Zealand